Akhet is a transcription of various Egyptian words.

Akhet may refer to:

 Akhet, the season of the flood in the ancient Egyptian calendar
 Akhet, a hieroglyph, meaning "horizon"
 Akhet, an album by Belgian industrial music band Klinik